Commander Mark Raymond Tandy,  is an officer of the Royal Australian Navy (RAN). He joined the RAN as a radio operator in 1982 and rose through the ranks to become Warrant Officer of the Navy in 2008. He relinquished the post in 2012 and was subsequently commissioned as an officer.

Early years
Tandy was born in Roebourne, Western Australia, and educated in Tennant Creek and Darwin. He joined the Royal Australian Navy (RAN) in 1982 as a radio operator.

Naval career
Tandy has served as either the Communications operator or supervisor at a number of establishments and ships of the RAN. Shore postings have included  (Nowra),  (Darwin),  (Canberra),  (Western Port Bay), ADF Recruiting Unit (Townsville) and Strategic Headquarters (Canberra).
.

In December 2002, Tandy was promoted to warrant officer and assumed the role of Operations Officer at the Naval Communications Area Master Station Australia (NAVCAMSAUS) during the Iraq War.

Tandy was selected to be the sixth Warrant Officer of the Navy in October 2008 and took up the appointment on 19 December 2008. He was awarded the Conspicuous Service Cross in the 2011 Queen's Birthday Honours in recognition of his "outstanding achievement" in this role. 

In July 2012 Tandy stood down as the Warrant Officer of the Navy, joining a program which allowed him to become an officer. He was appointed to the rank of lieutenant commander and served as executive officer of Naval Headquarters, South Queensland. Tandy was subsequently appointed  Officer in Charge Navy Indigenous Development Program. In the 2022 Queen's Birthday Honours, he was awarded a Bar to his Conspicuous Service Cross for his "outstanding devotion to duty" in leading the Indigenous Development Program.

Tandy holds a Master in Maritime Studies degree from the Australian Command and Staff College at Weston Creek (2007).

References

Living people
People from the Pilbara
Recipients of the Conspicuous Service Cross (Australia)
Royal Australian Navy officers
Year of birth missing (living people)